Iva (also Romanized as Īvā) is a village in Tatarestaq Rural District, Baladeh District, Nur County, Mazandaran Province, Iran. At the 2006 census, its population was 42, in 21 families.

References 

Populated places in Nur County